Valiabad (also Romanized as Valīābād) is a village in Abreis Rural District, Bazman District, Iranshahr County, Sistan and Baluchestan Province, Iran. At the 2006 census, its population was 53, in 16 families.

References 

Populated places in Iranshahr County